David Barsom Perley (1901–1979) was an ethnic Assyrian and known for his cultural activities. He was also known as a philosopher and nationalist who created some of the theories of Assyrian nationalism. Perley was originally of the Jacobite Syriac Orthodox Church, and was born in Harput, Turkey.

Quotes

See also
Assyrian nationalism

Bibliography
A Collection of Writings on Assyrians.

References

External links
 Dr. David Barsum Perley (1901-1979) - Assyrian Information Management.

1901 births
1979 deaths
Assyrian nationalists
Syriac Orthodox Christians
Turkish Oriental Orthodox Christians
People from Elazığ